Sunset Lake may refer to a place in the United States:

 Sunset Lake (Orlando, Florida)
 Sunset Lake (Braintree, Massachusetts)
 Sunset Lake (New Jersey), Cumberland County, New Jersey
 Sunset Lake, New Jersey, community on the east side of the lake
 Sunset Lake (Lakes Region, New Hampshire)
 Sunset Lake (Holly Springs, North Carolina)
 Sunset Lake (Portage County, Wisconsin)

See also
 Sunset Lake Floating Bridge, Brookfield, Vermont